The women's 500 metres at the 2011 Asian Winter Games was held on February 1, 2011 in Astana, Kazakhstan.

Schedule
All times are Almaty Time (UTC+06:00)

Results

Heats

Heat 1

Heat 2

Heat 3

Heat 4

Semifinals

Heat 1

Heat 2

Finals

Final B

Final A

References

Final

External links
Official website

Women 0500